André Lefaur (25 July 1879 – 5 December 1952) was a French film and theatre actor, notably working several times with director Sacha Guitry.

Partial filmography
 La Vénus d'Arles (1911)
 L'homme qui assassina (1913)
 Ainsi va la vie (1918, short) 
 The Tenth Symphony (1918)
 Une fleur dans les ronces (1920)
 Monsieur Lebidois propriétaire (1922)
 The Marriage of Rosine (1926)
 A Gentleman of the Ring (1926)
 His Highness Love (1931)
 Le Bal (1931)
 Orange Blossom (1932)
 His Best Client (1932)
 La dame de chez Maxim's (1933)
An Ideal Woman (1934)
 L'aristo (1934)
 Dora Nelson (1935)
 School for Coquettes (1935)
 Tovaritch (1935)
With a smile (1936)
 The King (1936)
 Let's Make a Dream (1936)
 Rigolboche (1936)
 Samson (1936)
 The Green Jacket (1937)
 The House Opposite (1937)
 La peau d'un autre (1937)
 The Club of Aristocrats (1937)
 Le fauteuil 47 (1937)
 Les dégourdis de la 11ème (1937)
 Adrienne Lecouvreur (1938)
 L'ange que j'ai vendu (1938)
 La Glu (1938) 
 La president (1938)
 Le monsieur de 5 heures (1938)
 Quatre heures du matin (1938)
 Un fichu métier (1938)
 Behind the Facade (1939)
 Entente cordiale (1939)
 Eusèbe depute (1939)
 Le chemin de l'honneur (1939)
 The Fatted Calf (1939)
 Mon oncle et mon cure (1939)
 Nine Bachelors (1939)
 Sacred Woods (1939)
 Terra di fuoco (1939)
 Miquette (1940)
 Paris-New York (1940)
 Parade en 7 nuits (1941)
 Soyez les bienvenus (1942)
 The Phantom Baron (1943)
 Les petites du quai aux fleurs (1944)

External links 
 

1952 deaths
1879 births
French male film actors
French male silent film actors
French male stage actors
Male actors from Paris
20th-century French male actors